Journalist 103 (born January 21, 1979) is an American rapper. After starting his career as part of the hip hop crew Mountain Climbaz in 1997, he later joined hip hop group The Left. He served as primary lyricist on the group's 2010 album Gas Mask, which Sputnik Music named one of the Best Underground Hip-Hop Albums of 2010.

In 2012 he released his debut solo album Reporting Live on Babygrande Records. With guest appearances by Freeway, Saigon, Fashawn, and production by Oddisee and Snowgoons, lyrically the album addresses diverse themes and incorporates a number of hip hop subgenres. Journalist 103 is currently working on his sophomore solo album, also to be released on Babygrande.

Early life
Journalist 103 was born and raised in Detroit, Michigan. After developing an interest in music, his cousin X-Gov was one of his first inspirations to go into rap, exposing him to artists such as DJ Premier and Gang Starr. He went on to listen to artists such as Proof, Royce, and Phat Kat. Other artists influential in his youth include Ice Cube, The Wu Tang Clan, and Eminem. Rapping by the age of eleven, he initially rapped under the name J Clip before changing his moniker to Journalist 103. Stated Journalist 103, "I earned my name from one of my old high school teacher's. We had to do a brief commercial in written form. When I submitted it she read it and told me I was a really good writer and that I should be a journalist. So the name just stuck with me ever since." He attended Detroit Central High School, and by age eighteen he was beginning to go to shows and market his music.

Music career

1990s-04: Mountain Climbaz, singles
Around 1997 he started professionally emceeing, performing at open mics around Detroit. He met and began collaborating with the producer Strike, forming the hip hop crew Mountain Climbaz. Other members joined and they performed in Detroit. While with Mountain Climbaz he became associated with Iron Fist Records, run by Proof, and made guest appearances on tracks by other artists. He contributed to the opening track ("Broken") on Proof's 2002 album Electric Coolaid Acid Testing. His 2003 track "Broken Again" featuring Mu, Proof, and Marvwon, received an award for best hip-hop group song of the year in 2004. The Mountain Climbaz released their only album, Unnecessary Roughness, in July 2004. In June 2005 Journalist 103 released his first solo mixtape, K.R.A.M. Movement.

2010: The Left, Gas Mask
After the disbanding of Mountain Climbaz, Journalist 103 co-founded the hip hop group The Left with Detroit producer Apollo Brown. The duo brought in DJ Soko to add to the tracks and DJ for their live performances. Journalist 103 was a primary lyricist behind the group's debut album Gas Mask, released in 2010. According to the Michigan Citizen, "the concept of the album’s title was to warn audiences that hip hop music is being used against the people like poison. Positive, thought-provoking music can act as a 'gas mask' to help filter out the nonsense."

Gas Mask was named Best Album of 2010 by KevinNottingham.com, and was in the Top 25 Albums of 2010 by HipHopDX and DJ Premier. Sputnik Music named it one of the Best Underground Hip-Hop Albums of 2010. Stated HipHopDX, Gas Mask "captured a nostalgic prestige with Journalist playing an integral part as the mouthpiece of the group's movement."

2012: Reporting Live
His debut solo album, "Reporting Live", was released by the New York-based independent label Babygrande Records in 2012. Reporting Live had guest appearances by Freeway, Saigon and Fashawn, and production from The Audible Doctor, Oddisee, Apollo Brown, and Snowgoons. The diverse topics addressed on the album include "love, following your dreams to success and the violence on the streets being a reflection of the violence of war and oppression in the world." His first single from Reporting Live, "Walk With Me," paints a picture of Detroit, with Oddisee producing.

Reception

HipHopDX.com gave Reporting Live a score of 3.5/5 and a positive review, praising both his delivery and lyricism. Refined Hype criticized the short length of several of tracks, but stated that "When you have an artist whose name is 'Journalist' and his project is called Reporting Live, you’re expecting music that serves as a form of journalism, and the Detroit rapper definitely makes it a priority to paint a picture of the environment around him in vivid detail."

2014: Recent projects
As of 2014 Journalist 103 is working on his sophomore solo album. He has recently contributed to tracks by Krate Krusaders, Snowgoons, and SoulPete.

Style
According to RapReviews.com, "Journalist has a hard-hitting, definitively rugged style of spitting."

According to BonusCut.com, "His rhymes are laced with social, economic and political anecdotes, and are an example of why hip-hop is educative." Stated Journalist 103, "The music corporations, they manufacture music. It’s not meant to be manufactured; it’s a creative process, you have to create it. It has to come from the heart ... I never come in with trying to follow gimmicks, or just be insincere. I want the audience to feel where I come from, I want them to feel like they can relate.”

Discography

Collaborations

Solo material

Albums and mixtapes

Singles

Guest appearances

Further reading
Interviews

Discographies
Journalist 103 at Allmusic
Journalist 103 at Discogs

See also
Detroit hip hop

References

External links
Journalist 103 on Facebook
Journalist 103 on YouTube
Journalist 103 on Bandcamp
Journalist 103 on Twitter

Living people
Rappers from Detroit
1979 births
21st-century American rappers